Løddesøl is a village in Arendal municipality in Agder county, Norway. The village is located along the Norwegian County Road 408 on the eastern shore of the river Nidelva. The village has an elementary school and preschool as well as a sawmill and some small stores.

References

Villages in Agder
Arendal